Rajaur Village is situated on the bank of River Kamla in Jhanjharpur tehsil of Madhubani district. The population of the village is approximately 2500. It is in Baghwanpur PanchyatWard No 1.

The nearest village is Thengha, and the nearest police station and market are in Madhepur. In this village there are markets on the afternoons of Tuesday and Friday.

Culture 
In this Village there are three temples: Baghwan Vishwnath, Hanuman Mandir and a Seeta shrine. A Festival occurs in the Month of Kartik name as Kartik Kuwanr every year.
The 'Chhath Pooja' is organised by all communities of the village

Demographics 
The village hosts communities including Maithil Brahmin, Barai, Suri, Taili and Harijans.

Education 
The village has Primary school

Transport 
The area has one Texi stand near Kamla Bandh

Economy 
Mostly people are farmers

References 
http://wikimapia.org/#lang=en&lat=26.123307&lon=86.331253&z=14&m=b&show=/10247383/Rajaur

Villages in Madhubani district